The 2018 season was the Hawthorn Football Club's 94th season in the Australian Football League and 117th overall, the 19th season playing home games at the Melbourne Cricket Ground, the 18th season playing home games at the University of Tasmania Stadium, the 14th season under head coach Alastair Clarkson, and the 2nd season with Jarryd Roughead as club captain. This was also the first season without either Luke Hodge or Sam Mitchell on the list since 2001.

Hawthorn improved on their record from 2017, finishing in fourth place with a  record. This was the 7th time in the last 8 seasons Hawthorn won 15 or more games. Their 4-point win against  in round 22 clinched a finals series appearance for the first time since 2016, and their 10th in the last 14 seasons.

Hawthorn were defeated by the defending premiers  64–95 in the qualifying final. This was the first time the two had played a final against each other. This was Hawthorn's third consecutive finals defeat having lost two finals in 2016. It was also Hawthorn's third consecutive qualifying final defeat having lost qualifying finals in 2015 and 2016. Hawthorn were eliminated from the finals by  71–104 in the Semi-final. This was the seventh time the two teams had played a final against each other, and the first time since 1990. This was Hawthorn's fourth consecutive finals defeat equalling the club record. It was also Hawthorn's second consecutive semi-final defeat having lost the semi-final in 2016. Hawthorn also became the first team under the AFL final eight system to be eliminated in straight-sets twice having also being eliminated in straight-sets in 2016.

Club summary 
The 2018 AFL season was the 122nd season of the VFL/AFL competition since its inception in 1897; having entered the competition in 1925, it was the 94th season contested by the Hawthorn Football Club. Tasmania and iiNet continued as the club's two major sponsors, as they had done since 2006 and 2013 respectively, while Adidas continued to manufacture the club's on-and-off field apparel, as they had done since 2013. Hawthorn continued its alignment with the Box Hill Hawks Football Club in the Victorian Football League, allowing Hawthorn-listed players to play with the Box Hill Hawks when not selected in AFL matches.

Senior personnel 
Alastair Clarkson continued as the club's head coach for the fourteenth consecutive season. While Jarryd Roughead continued as the club's captain for the second consecutive season. On 22 August 2017, it was announced Cameron Bruce was departing the club at the end of the 2017 season to join Carlton as a senior assistant coach. On 29 August 2017, it was announced that  assistant coach Scott Burns and former  player Darren Glass would join Hawthorn as assistant coaches. On 2 October 2017, it was announced that Tracey Gaudry would step down as the club's CEO. Peter Nankivell was appointed as the interim CEO. On 4 October 2017, Richard Garvey resigned as president of the club, with Jeff Kennett re-appointed in the role. Kennett previously served as president of the club from 2005–2011. Garvey remained at the club as a director. On 17 October 2017, it was announced that Justin Reeves was appointed as the CEO of the club. On 2 August 2018, it was announced that after six seasons as assistant coach Brett Ratten would be leaving the club at the end of the season to explore new opportunities.

Playing list changes

Trades

Draft

AFL draft

Rookie draft

Retirements and delistings

2018 player squad

Season fixture

AFLX

JLT Community series

Premiership season

Ladder

Finals

Awards, records and milestones

Awards
AFL awards
Leigh Matthews Trophy: Tom Mitchell.
Brownlow Medal: Tom Mitchell.
All-Australian team: Luke Breust, Jack Gunston, Tom Mitchell.
AFLPA player of the month: Luke Breust – July.

Club awards
 Peter Crimmins Medal: Tom Mitchell
 Leading goalkicker: Luke Breust
 Best player in finals: Liam Shiels
 Most consistent player: Jack Gunston
 Most promising player: Blake Hardwick
 Best Clubman: Taylor Duryea
 Best first year player (debut season): James Worpel

Records

VFL/AFL records 
 Most disposals in a single game: 54 – Tom Mitchell
Most disposals in a season: 848 – Tom Mitchell

Club records 
 Most handballs in a single game: 34 – Tom Mitchell
 Most contested possessions in a single game: 27 – Tom Mitchell
Most inside 50's in a single match: 12 – Liam Shiels (Tied with Clinton Young)
Most clearances in a season: 192 – Tom Mitchell
Most contested possessions in a season: 388 – Tom Mitchell
Most contested marks: 308 – Jarryd Roughead
Most marks inside 50: 617 – Jarryd Roughead
 Most games coached: 329 – Alastair Clarkson
 Most victories coached: 205 – Alastair Clarkson
 Most home and away games coached: 303 – Alastair Clarkson
 Most home and away victories coached: 189 – Alastair Clarkson
Most finals games coached: 26 – Alastair Clarkson

Milestones
Round 1
Jack Gunston – 150th AFL game.
 Jarman Impey – Hawthorn debut.

Round 2
Paul Puopolo – 150th AFL game.
 Tom Mitchell – 50th AFL goal.
 Jarman Impey – 1st goal for Hawthorn.

Round 3
James Frawley – 50th game for Hawthorn.

Round 4
Ben Stratton –150th AFL game.
 David Mirra – AFL debut.

Round 6
Jack Gunston – 300th AFL goal.
 Harry Morrison – 1st AFL goal.
 James Worpel – AFL debut.

Round 8
James Sicily – 50th AFL game.

Round 9
James Worpel – 1st AFL goal.
 Mitchell Lewis – AFL debut.

Round 10
Blake Hardwick – 1st AFL goal.

Round 13
Shaun Burgoyne – 350th AFL game.
James Sicily – 50th AFL goal.

Round 14
Tom Mitchell – 100th AFL game.

Round 15
Jarryd Roughead – 550th AFL goal.

Round 17
Jack Gunston – 300th goal for Hawthorn.
 James Frawley – 200th AFL game.
 Jack Gunston - 150th game for Hawthorn.

Round 18
Alastair Clarkson – 200th win as coach.

 Round 20
 Alastair Clarkson – 300th home and away game as coach.

 Round 21
Luke Breust – 50th goal for the season.
Conor Nash – AFL debut.

 Round 22
Conor Nash – 1st AFL goal.

 Qualifying final
 Shaun Burgoyne – 200th game for Hawthorn.
 Isaac Smith – 150th AFL goal.

 Semi-final
 Daniel Howe – 50th AFL game.
 Ryan Schoenmakers – 50th AFL goal.
 Jack Gunston – 50th goal for the season.

References

Hawthorn Football Club Season, 2018
Hawthorn Football Club seasons